Patricia Ojeda Ramírez (born 8 March 1991) is a Spanish footballer who plays as a defender for Sporting de Huelva.

Club career
Patri Ojeda started her career at Agüimes.

References

External links
Profile at La Liga

1991 births
Living people
Women's association football defenders
Spanish women's footballers
Footballers from Las Palmas
Sporting de Huelva players
Primera División (women) players